The tenth season of King of the Hill originally aired Sundays at 7:30–8:00 p.m. (EST) on the Fox Broadcasting Company from September 18, 2005 to May 14, 2006. The Region 1 DVD was released on April 7, 2015.

Production
The showrunners for the season were John Altschuler and Dave Krinsky. The majority of episodes in this season are leftover episodes from the season 9 (9ABE) production line, as well as one episode from the season 8 (8ABE) production line ("Bystand Me"). The AABE production line (much like The Simpsons 3G production line for seasons eight and nine) is a short-lived line and only lasts for five episodes (four airing this season and the fifth airing as a leftover episode next season).

Episodes

References

2005 American television seasons
2006 American television seasons
King of the Hill 10